Pyramimonas is a genus of green algae in the order Pyramimonadales.

References

Chlorophyta genera
Pyramimonadophyceae